Silurus is a genus of catfishes native to Europe and Asia.

Species
There are currently 20 recognized species in this genus:
 Silurus aristotelis Garman, 1890 (Aristotle's catfish)
 Silurus asotus Linnaeus, 1758 (Amur catfish)
 Silurus biwaensis Tomoda, 1961 (Lake Biwa giant catfish)
 Silurus burmanensis Thant, 1967 
 Silurus caobangensis V. H. Nguyễn, T. H. N. Vũ & T. D. P. Nguyễn, 2015 (Yellow catfish) 
 Silurus chantrei Sauvage, 1882
 Silurus dakrongensis V. H. Nguyễn, T. H. N. Vũ & T. D. P. Nguyễn, 2015 (Dakrong catfish) 
 Silurus duanensis X. Y. Hu, J. H. Lan & C. G. Zhang, 2004 
 Silurus glanis Linnaeus, 1758 (Wels catfish)
 Silurus grahami Regan, 1907
 Silurus langsonensis V. H. Nguyễn, T. H. N. Vũ & T. D. P. Nguyễn, 2015 (Flower catfish) 
 Silurus lanzhouensis H. L. Chen, 1977 (Lanzhou catfish)
 Silurus lithophilus Tomoda, 1961 (Rock catfish)
 Silurus longibarbatus Li, Li, Zhang & He, 2019
 Silurus mento Regan, 1904 (Kunming catfish)
 Silurus meridionalis H. L. Chen, 1977 (Yangtze catfish)
 Silurus microdorsalis Mori, 1936 (Slender catfish)
 Silurus soldatovi Nikolskii & Soin, 1948 (Soldatov's catfish)
Silurus tomodai  
 Silurus triostegus Heckel, 1843 (Mesopotamian catfish)

References

 
Siluridae
Catfish genera
Taxa named by Carl Linnaeus
Freshwater fish genera
Taxonomy articles created by Polbot